The British Journal of Mathematical and Statistical Psychology is a British scientific journal founded in 1947. It covers the fields of psychology, statistics, and mathematical psychology. It was established as the British Journal of Psychology (Statistical Section), was renamed the British Journal of Statistical Psychology in 1953, and was renamed again to its current title in 1965.

Abstracting and indexing 
The journal is indexed in ''Current Index to Statistics, PsycINFO, Social Sciences Citation Index, Current Contents / Social & Behavioral Sciences, Science Citation Index Expanded, and Scopus.

Publications established in 1947
Statistics journals
Mathematical and statistical psychology journals
Wiley-Blackwell academic journals
British Psychological Society academic journals
Triannual journals